Indiana has nine congressional districts.  They were last redrawn after the 2020 census and took effect in 2023, following the 2022 elections.  For a history of who has served in each district, see  United States congressional delegations from Indiana§House of Representatives.

Current districts and representatives
List of members of the House delegation, their terms in office, district boundaries, and the district political ratings according to the CPVI. The delegation in the 118th United States Congress has 9 members: 7 Republicans and 2 Democrats.

Historical and present district boundaries
Table of United States congressional district boundary maps in the State of Indiana, presented chronologically. All redistricting events that took place in Indiana between 1973 and 2013 are shown.

Obsolete districts
, obsolete since statehood
, obsolete since the 2000 census
, obsolete since the 1980 census
, obsolete since the 1940 census
, obsolete since the 1930 census
 (1816–1823; 1873–1875)

See also
List of United States congressional districts

References